Outright was an accounting and bookkeeping application that assists small businesses and sole proprietors with managing their business's income and expenses.  It also provided them with a means to organize and categorize expenses for filing a Schedule C. It was acquired by GoDaddy in 2012 for approximately $20 million and has been rebranded as GoDaddy Online Bookkeeping.  In May 2022, GoDaddy announced the software would be discontinued on June 18, 2022.

History

Kevin Reeth and Ben Curren worked together at Intuit in 2006 and then later at a web-application firm called Esomnie LLC. As a Product Manager and Software Engineer respectively, the two were heavily involved in the development and marketing of Quicken products.

Curren and Reeth had become increasingly frustrated with the complexity of doing taxes for small businesses, so in 2008 they founded a company and website called BootStrap. The Website was renamed Outright just a few months after launch, though it continues to be operated by BootStrap, Inc.

In 2009, the company raised a total of $7.7 million funding from Sequoia Capital, First Round Capital, Shasta Ventures and SoftTech VC among others. Today, the website manages $1.2 billion in transactions from small businesses and independent contractors.

On July 17, 2012, Outright.com announced in an email to all customers that they had been acquired by GoDaddy.com.

Items & Services
Outright.com tracks and manages business income, expenses and tax liabilities. Users input their business account information and Outright structures that information into reports and prepares it in a way that can assist with tax submissions. The online-only tool does not involve any software installations and can import financial information from PayPal, FreshBooks, oDesk, and other financial management tools.

The website has the following features:
 Reports income and expenses for sole proprietors filing a Schedule C or 1040
 Manages W-9s for paying independent contractors, freelancers, and anyone outside of company staff for 1099 filings

Outright also has an eBay Bookkeeping Selling Manager app that imports transaction data from eBay and PayPal accounts to help eBay sellers manage their finances.

Reviews
PCMag gave Outright Plus 2.5/5, praising its user interface; however they criticised its limited features, saying it would be ok for "a sole proprietor or very small business", and recommending QuickBooks Online for those seeking a fuller-featured solution.

Tech Republic said Outright was "worth a look", comparing it to Intuit's Mint.com but cautioned that while it offered better tax-calculation facilities than Mint.com, it offers no way to actually pay taxes. Small Business Trends recommended it for sole proprietors, finding it lacked features such as payroll necessary for businesses with employees. Macworld in 2010 scored it 3.5/5, saying "it was easy to get data into the application, but was missing some critical features that Outright said would be added at a later date."

References

External links
 Outright Official Website  

Accounting software
Companies based in Mountain View, California
Companies based in Silicon Valley
Financial services companies established in 2008
Financial software companies
2012 mergers and acquisitions
Online financial services companies of the United States
Tax software of the United States